Great Western Railway (GWR) 6000 Class King George V is a preserved British steam locomotive.

Background

After developing the "new" GWR Star Class in the form of the GWR Castle Class, chief mechanical engineer Charles Collett was faced with the need to develop an even more powerful locomotive to pull 13+ carriage express trains.

Pole agreed to allow Collett to explore such a design, subject to getting tractive effort above .

Consequently, this restricted them as to where they could operate under both GWR and British Railways ownership. To accommodate the largest possible boiler, and to conform with Pole's requested tractive effort requirement, the "King" class were equipped with smaller  main driving wheels than the "Castle" class. This resulted in both the GWR's highest-powered locomotive design, but most importantly a higher tractive effort than the "Castle". This combination allowed the "King" class to pull the now required higher-weight 13+ coach express trains from London to Bristol and onwards to the West Country, at a higher-speed timetable average than the "Castle".

With the class to be originally named after notable cathedrals, in light of the invitation to feature in the Baltimore and Ohio Railroad's centenary celebrations, the GWR decided to make them more notable by naming the class after British Kings.

Operational career

As the first of the class, No. 6000 was specifically named after the then monarch of the United Kingdom King George V. Built at Swindon Works and completed in June 1927, following a period of running in, the locomotive was shipped to the United States in August 1927, to feature in the B&O's centenary celebrations. During the celebrations it was presented with a bell and a plaque, and these are carried to this day. This led to it being affectionately known as "The Bell". The bell carries the inscription:

After returning from the US it was allocated to Old Oak Common. Moved by British Railways to Bristol in 1950, it was returned to Old Oak Common in 1959, and withdrawn by the Western Region of British Railways in December 1962 after covering .

Preservation
The locomotive was officially preserved as part of the national collection. It was restored to main line running order at the Bulmer's Railway Centre in Hereford. Operationally based at Hereford, in 1971 it became the very first steam locomotive to break the British Railways mainline steam ban that had been in place since the completion of the Fifteen Guinea Special in 1968. Its restoration to main line service and subsequent operation is often credited with opening the door for the return of steam to the mainlines of the UK.

After years of running, a costly overhaul of the locomotive was declined by the National Railway Museum. In part, this was due to the fact that, since its second renovation, a second class-member King Edward I had been restored for mainline operation.

After closure of the Bulmer's Steam Centre in 1990, No. 6000 moved to the Swindon "Steam" Railway Museum. In 2008, it swapped places with No. 92220 Evening Star, and became resident at the National Railway Museum. In late 2015, No. 6000, along with City of Truro, returned to STEAM – Museum of the Great Western Railway (located at the site of the old railway works in Swindon), and both were put on display in preparation for Swindon 175 (in 2016), celebrating 175 years since the inception of Swindon as a railway town. Both locomotives are expected to remain at Swindon for 5 years.

Gallery

References

External links
 
Pathe Newsreel of King George V in 1968  

6000
Railway locomotives introduced in 1927
6000
Standard gauge steam locomotives of Great Britain
George V